The Rwandan Air Force is the air branch of the Rwandan Defence Forces.

History 
After achieving independence in 1962, the Air Force was formed with the aid of Belgium, the initial aircraft consisted of three ex-French Air Force CM.170 Magisters, which operated in a counterinsurgency role along with a Britten-Norman Islander. Other deliveries included SA 342L Gazelles, Nord Noratlas, SOCATA Guerrier, and C-47 Skytrains. After fighting began between the RPA and the government in 1990 most aircraft were shot down, destroyed on the ground or crashed.

Inventory

References

External links 

Official website
 https://www.globalsecurity.org/military/world/rwanda/air-force.htm
 https://www.rwandan-flyer.com/rwanda-air-force-guide-2014

Air Force
Air Force
Military aviation in Africa
Air forces by country